Munde U.K. De (literal translation: "Boys from the U.K."), distributed in English-speaking territories with the additional tagline British by Right, Punjabi by Heart!, is a Punjabi film by writer-director Manmohan Singh. The movie stars Jimmy Sheirgill, Amrinder Gill, Neeru Bajwa, Rana Ranbir, and Gurpreet Ghuggi. It was released in India 8 May 2009, and in Los Angeles, California, US, on 22 May 2009, among other territories. It has a running time of 149 minutes.

Plot
Two young Punjabi-British men visit their homeland, Punjab: Roop Singh (Jimmy Sheirgill), comes to see his grandfather, Gurdit Singh (Arun Bali) and Roop's touristy pal DJ (Gurpreet Ghuggi) comes to see how Punjab is like. Roop meets Reet Brar (Neeru Bajwa), a university classmate of his cousin Deepi's, and falls for her, and DJ falls for brainy, Kulwant Kaur (Akshita Vasudeva), another classmate. Roop agrees to let his aunt be his matchmaker and set up an arranged marriage for himself and Reet, but the modern-thinking Reet wants no part of what she considers outmoded provincialism. Her father (Deep Dhillon) angrily sets up an arranged marriage for her with Jagjot Gill (debut of singer Amrinder Gill,). Reet, however, reconsiders and realizes she loves Roop after all, and Kulwant falls for DJ too. Reet tells Jagjot, that she loves Roop a lot, so to help the lovers Jagjot says he's not ready to get married. After this incident no boy will marry Reet so, Reet's father and her ne'er-do-well brother, Jaile (Binnu Dhillon), devise a plan to figure out if Roop really loves Reet: Her father will give his consent if Roop can find a British bride for Jaile, which will prove that Roop is ready to do anything for Reet. DJ calls in an old girlfriend from UK, party girl, Candy (Khushboo), who flies in to help. They plan a scheme which will scare Jaile away. Candy acts like a traditional, Punjabi girl, and wins Jaile's heart, so they fix, Roop and Reet's and Jaile and Candy's engagement for the same day. Candy tells Kulwant that DJ was in many relationships with many different girls, since she still loves DJ. After hearing this, Kulwant is heart-broken, and leaves DJ. Day before the engagement Candy reveals how modern girls really are, by bringing Jaila to a pub. On the engagement day Jaile runs away. Candy tells DJ, that if he doesn't sit in Jaile's spot, she will reveal the truth. So to help out his friend, DJ and Candy get engaged and so do Roop and Reet.

Overseeing all the rom-com complications is Khoji (comedian Rana Ranbir, who wrote the film's dialog, with story supplied by the film's director-cinematographer, Manmohan Singh), the house manager for the well-to-do grandfather's estate and staff.

Cast
Jimmy Sheirgill - Roop Singh
Neeru Bajwa - Reet Brar
Gurpreet Ghuggi – DJ
Akshita Vasudeva—Kulwant Kaur
Amrinder Gill – Jagjot Gill
Deep Dhillon – Mr. Brar
Sunita Dheer- Mrs. Brar
Arun Bali – Gurdit Singh
Rana Ranbir – Khoji, the house manager
Khushboo Grewal  – Candy 
Binnu Dhillon - Jaile Brar, Reet's brother
Teenu Sharma - Deepi, Roop's cousin
Kulbir Badesron - Roop's aunt
Atro - Old lady on tractor

Release
Munde U.K. De was released in India 8 May 2009, and in Canada, the UK, Australia, the United States and other territories on 22 May 2009. In India the Response of Munde U.K De was strong and first-day shows sold out, earning Rs 12.5 crore in the first two weeks of release. Due to this response, Munde U.K De was released overseas with 36 prints, and it became a blockbuster, with a gross of Rs 26.9 crore in just the month of May alone. (The film's budget was Rs 4.5 crore.)

Crew
Production companies: Mukutwalas in association with Punj-Aab Movie International
 Story, Director, Cinematographer: Manmohan Singh
 Dialogue: Rana Ranbir
 Producer: Kamal Mukut
 Music: Sukshinder Shinda, Babloo Kumar
Lyrics: Babu Singh Maan, Amarjit Musapuria, Rana Ranbir
Background score: Anjar Biswas
Editor: Bunty Negi
Singers: Sunidhi Chauhan, Amrinder Gill, Jasbir Jassi, Sardool Sikander, Ravinder Grewal, Labh Janjua, Sudesh Kumari, Miss Pooja.
 Chief assistance Director :Sudhir Kumar
 Assistant Director : Vakil Singh

Songs
Source: H. S. Communication press release

Reception
R. Paul Dhillon of the Vancouver, British Columbia arts and entertainment website Straight.com (Actor Neeru Bajwa is Vancouver-raised), bemoaned "a lame plot and largely clichéd characters", and called it "another half-baked NRIs-in-the-Punjab tale", using the abbreviation for non-resident Indian, while he did praise "Ghuggi, who’s become Punjabi cinema's version of Jim Carrey", for "a very nuanced and controlled performance, right down to the accent and mannerisms of Indo-British lads". Frank Lovece of Film Journal International concurred, saying the "unexceptional romantic comedy won't turn any U.S. cineastes into Punjwood aficionados, and lacks the production values and star power Indian-American audiences have come to expect. ... The movie has modest charms ... but they're often drowned out by a bombastically melodramatic score, and lots of sitting-around-talking scenes with go-nowhere dialogue". Singah, he wrote, "shoots with dull, flattened lighting far removed from Bollywood's typical crystalline sheen". Maitland McDonagh of MissFlickChick.com took a middle ground, calling the film "overlong, painfully clichéd but occasionally surprisingly sly and clever".

Despite these negative reviews it seems to have done very well at the box office

Sequel

In February 2014 it was announced that there would be a sequel to Munde U.K. De, entitled Aa Gaye Munde U.K. De. The movie marks the third time a Punjabi film has had a sequel made. The film is releasing on 8 August 2014 and was featuring much of the same cast, including of Jimmy Sheirgill , Neeru Bajwa , Gurpreet Ghuggi and crew of the first film.

References

External links
 Southern, Nathan. All Movie Guide Overview: Munde UK de

Punjabi-language Indian films
2000s Punjabi-language films